This page provides the summary of BOTY Japan held in Japan. Winner advances to BOTY International also known as Battle of the Year.

Winners

Between 2007 and 2009 BOTY Asia regional preliminary sent the top 3 finishers to the BOTY International.

2013 BOTY Japan Preliminaries
BOTY Japan 2013 included an additional semi finals placer to add additional battles to the tournament. Six crews qualified after the showcase stage of the competition consisting of the two highest scoring crews automatically qualified for the semi finals and four crews competing for the two remaining places against them.

Flooriorz won BOTY Japan 2013 and represented Japan at BOTY International held in Germany.

External links
 Battle of the Year official website
 Battle of the Year TV special at MixeryRawDeluxe.TV

Breakdance
Street dance competitions